Condat-sur-Vézère (literally Condat on Vézère) is a commune in the Dordogne department in Nouvelle-Aquitaine in southwestern France. Condat-Le Lardin station has rail connections to Bordeaux, Périgueux and Brive-la-Gaillarde.

Population

See also
Château de la Fleunie
Château de la Petite Filolie
Communes of the Dordogne department

References

Communes of Dordogne